Brown Eyes (Korean: 브라운아이즈) was a South Korean singing duo that debuted in 2001. They are considered one of South Korea's most important R&B groups, given their immense commercial success.

History

Despite having no television appearances, Brown Eyes managed to have record sales of 640,000 and 618,026 for their first and second albums, respectively.

In May 2002, Brown Eyes performed the Korean version of the Official Anthem along with Lena Park for the 2002 FIFA World Cup held in South Korea and Japan.

In the midst of their popularity, Brown Eyes announced their official disbandment in April 2003. However, after five years, they got back together for a third album Two Things Needed For The Same Purpose And 5 Objects in 2008.

Members

Yoon Gun

After leaving Brown Eyes in 2003, Yoon Gun went solo and released a self-titled album that same year. Yoon Gun has also branched out to do collaborations with artists such as Seohyun of Girls' Generation and Hyori. In 2012, Yoon Gun joined Sony Music and released his solo album "Far East 2 Bricklane" on October 18. He replaced PSY as a judge on the 4th season of Superstar K as PSY was unable to continue due to promotional activities abroad.

Naul

In 2003 after the disbandment of Brown Eyes, Naul formed a separate group Brown Eyed Soul with three other members Jungyup, Young Jun, and Sang Hoon.

Discography

Studio albums

Awards

Mnet Asian Music Awards

References

K-pop music groups
South Korean boy bands
South Korean contemporary R&B musical groups
South Korean musical duos
Male musical duos